The KB Cup is one of two rugby cup competitions in the Czech Republic, the other being the ČSRU Cup.

History
The Česká Rugbyová Unie (ČSRU) went into partnership with KB in 2003, with the partnership covering the national team as well as the national leagues.

Results
The scores in blue are links to accounts of finals on the site of the Czech Rugby Union (ČSRU) - in Czech

External links
 Pohár KB 2007
 Pohár KB 2008
 Pohár KB 2009

Rugby union competitions in the Czech Republic